The transitional federal institutions of Somalia are the key government foundations created in October–November 2004 at a conference held in Nairobi, Kenya. They include the following:
 Transitional Federal Charter (TFC)
 Transitional Federal Parliament (TFP) 
 Transitional Federal Government (TFG)

The mandate of the transitional federal institutions expired in August 2012, when the Federal Government of Somalia was established.

See also
Judiciary of Somalia

References

2004 establishments in Somalia
Elections in Somalia
Transitional federal government of Somalia
Government of Somalia
2004 disestablishments in Somalia